Wagner Santos Lago (born 1 January 1978), known as Wagner, is a Brazilian football manager and former player who is the current youth coach of Bosnian Premier League club Široki Brijeg.

He played 13 years for Široki Brijeg, where he was also the club captain and won one league title and three cups. Wagner would later go on to manage the under-19 team of Široki Brijeg.

Playing career

Early career
Born in Ilhéus, Brazil, Wagner began playing football with local clubs in the Bahia, Goiás and São Paulo state competitions before embarking on a fifteen-year career in Bosnia and Herzegovina. He left Jaboticabal Atlético for Posušje in July 2003.

Široki Brijeg
In the summer of 2005, Wagner went to Široki Brijeg where he played the best games in his entire career and also won one league title and three national cups. He had an average of more than ten goals per season while playing for Široki Brijeg. In the 2013–14 league season, Wagner was the league top goalscorer, scoring 18 goals in that season.

He left Široki at the age of 40, setting a record of 125 goals and 297 appearances in the Bosnian Premier League with Široki Brijeg and Posušje.

Imotski
In August 2018, Wagner signed a part-time contract with Croatian 3. HNL club Imotski.

Managerial career

Široki Brijeg U19
On 1 July 2020, after finishing his playing career, Wagner became the new manager of the under-19 team of Široki Brijeg. In his first game as manager, Wagner's team lost against the under-19 team of Željezničar on 9 August 2020.

Personal life
Wagner's brother, Ricardo, was also a professional footballer who played with Wagner at Široki Brijeg and became a naturalised Bosnian international.

Managerial statistics

Honours

Player
Široki Brijeg
Bosnian Premier League: 2005–06
Bosnian Cup: 2006–07, 2012–13, 2016–17

Individual
Awards
Bosnian Premier League Player of the Season: 2014–15

Performance
Bosnian Premier League Top Goalscorer: 2013–14 (18 goals)

References

External links

1978 births
Living people
People from Ilhéus
Sportspeople from Bahia
Brazilian footballers
Brazilian expatriate footballers
Expatriate footballers in Bosnia and Herzegovina
Expatriate footballers in Croatia
Premier League of Bosnia and Herzegovina players
HŠK Posušje players
NK Široki Brijeg players
NK Imotski players
Association football midfielders
Brazilian football managers
Brazilian expatriate football managers
Expatriate football managers in Bosnia and Herzegovina
Brazilian expatriate sportspeople in Bosnia and Herzegovina
Brazilian expatriate sportspeople in Croatia